Jo-Anne Claude Beaumier (born 10 April 1996) is a footballer who plays as a defender for Canadian club Révolution FC.

Beaumier was born in Canada to a Canadian father and a Lebanese mother. She obtained Lebanese citizenship through naturalization in order to represent Lebanon internationally.

Club career 
In 2022, Beaumier played for Révolution FC in Canada.

See also
 List of Lebanon women's international footballers

References

External links
 
 

1996 births
Living people
People from LaSalle, Quebec
Soccer players from Montreal
Lebanese people of Canadian descent
Canadian people of Lebanese descent
Canadian sportspeople of Asian descent
Sportspeople of Lebanese descent
Naturalized citizens of Lebanon
Lebanese women's footballers
Canadian women's soccer players
Lebanese women's futsal players
Women's association football defenders
Zouk Mosbeh SC footballers
Beirut Football Academy players
Lebanese Women's Football League players
Lebanon women's international footballers